Tyrique Jones (born May 3, 1997) is an American professional basketball player for Türk Telekom of the Basketbol Süper Ligi (BSL). He played college basketball for the Xavier Musketeers.

Early life and high school career
Jones grew up playing football as a tight end and defensive end and idolized Dwight Freeney. However, while attending Bloomfield High School in Bloomfield, Connecticut, Freeney's alma mater, he began to focus on basketball instead. As a junior, he averaged 10.6 points, 8.4 rebounds and 3.1 blocks per game, leading his team to the Class S state semifinals and earning First Team All-State honors from the Hartford Courant. He played Amateur Athletic Union basketball for the New York Rens and Expressions Elite. For his senior season, Jones transferred to Vermont Academy in Saxtons River, Vermont, averaging 13.2 points and 7.6 rebounds per game. He led his team to the Class AA New England Preparatory School Athletic Council (NEPSAC) Finals and was named to the Class AA All-NEPSAC Second Team. Jones played a postgraduate season, averaging 19.8 points, 9.7 rebounds, 2.2 blocks, 1.5 steals and 1.7 assists per game. He led Vermont Academy to its first ever NEPSAC title and was a Class AA All-NEPSAC First Team selection.

Recruiting
Jones was considered a four-star recruit by ESPN and Rivals, and a three-star recruit by 247Sports. On June 29, 2015, he committed to play college basketball for Xavier over offers from Florida State, Cincinnati and Texas Tech, among other high major programs.

College career
As a freshman, Jones started four games in the NCAA Tournament and helped Xavier reach the Elite Eight. He averaged 4.1 points and 3.2 rebounds per game. He struggled with leg soreness during his sophomore season, which he credited to not utilizing the training room enough, and he missed two games with a shoulder injury. Jones largely played behind Kerem Kanter and Sean O'Mara as a sophomore, averaging seven points and 4.5 rebounds per contest. He focused on losing weight by eating a healthy diet as well as outside shooting and weight lifting going into his junior season. Coach Chris Mack praised his attitude and demeanor, calling him one of his favorite players.

On November 10, 2018, Jones scored 19 points and had a career-high 20 rebounds in a 91–85 win over Evansville. He posted a career-high 22 points and had 11 rebounds in a 78–76 overtime loss to Texas in the second round of the NIT, but missed a layup to tie the game at the end. As a junior, Jones averaged 11.3 points and 7.7 rebounds per game. Following the season he declared for the 2019 NBA draft but ultimately returned to Xavier. On November 22, 2019, Jones posted 17 points with 11 rebounds in a 75–74 double overtime win over UConn and blocked a potential game-winning shot at the end of regulation. In his final collegiate game on March 12, 2020, he tied his career-high with 22 points in a 71–67 loss to DePaul. Jones averaged 14 points, 11 rebounds, 1.1 steals and one block per game as a senior and had 20 double-doubles, the fourth-most for Division I players. He was named to the Second Team All-Big East.

Professional career
On September 21, 2020, Jones signed his first professional contract with Wonju DB Promy of the Korean Basketball League.

On December 31, 2020, he signed with Hapoel Tel Aviv of the Israeli Basketball Premier League. In 2020-21 he was third in the Israel Basketball Premier League in blocked shots per game (1.4), 6th in offensive rebounds (2.6), and fifth in two-point field goal percentage (67.2 per cent).

Jones joined the Phoenix Suns for the 2021 NBA Summer League. On August 21, 2021, he signed with Victoria Libertas Pesaro of the Lega Basket Serie A.

On July 23, 2022, he has signed with Türk Telekom of the Basketbol Süper Ligi (BSL).

Career statistics

College

|-
| style="text-align:left;"| 2016–17
| style="text-align:left;"| Xavier
| 37 || 13 || 11.0 || .602 || – || .488 || 3.1 || .3 || .2 || .4 || 4.2
|-
| style="text-align:left;"| 2017–18
| style="text-align:left;"| Xavier
| 32 || 19 || 15.0 || .627 || – || .589 || 4.5 || .5 || .6 || .6 || 7.0
|-
| style="text-align:left;"| 2018–19
| style="text-align:left;"| Xavier
| 34 || 31 || 24.8 || .624 || – || .641 || 7.7 || .8 || .8 || .9 || 11.3
|-
| style="text-align:left;"| 2019–20
| style="text-align:left;"| Xavier
| 32 || 32 || 28.2 || .557 || – || .592 || 11.0 || 1.5 || 1.0 || 1.1 || 14.0
|- class="sortbottom"
| style="text-align:center;" colspan="2"| Career
| 135 || 95 || 19.5 || .595 || – || .596 || 6.5 || .7 || .6 || .7 || 9.0

Personal life
Jones' mother, Petronia "Winnie" Bailey, emigrated with her brother from Jamaica to Connecticut at age 11. His father, Lester, was born in The Bahamas to Jamaican parents. On May 1, 2002, when Jones was four years old, his father jumped into Connecticut River and died by drowning, following an encounter with the police.

Jones was nicknamed "Eighty-Eight" by his father because his birth weight was eight pounds and eight ounces. The number was tattooed on Jones' right bicep when he was 16 years old; it was his first tattoo. He has a tattoo of the number 32 on his right shoulder and upper arm to honor his father's high school basketball jersey number at Weaver High School.

References

External links
Xavier Musketeers bio

1997 births
Living people
American men's basketball players
American expatriate basketball people in Israel
American expatriate basketball people in South Korea
American people of Jamaican descent
American people of Bahamian descent
Basketball players from Hartford, Connecticut
Bloomfield High School (Connecticut) alumni
Hapoel Tel Aviv B.C. players
Power forwards (basketball)
Vermont Academy alumni
Victoria Libertas Pallacanestro players
Xavier Musketeers men's basketball players